Luiss Business School is a leading Italian business school, specialized in business and management studies.

Founded in 1986, Luiss Business School is the business school of the Libera Università Internazionale degli Studi Sociali Guido Carli, (LUISS). Its educational portfolio includes Masters, MBAs, Executive Programmes and Custom Programmes.

The main campus is located in the historical 19th century building of Villa Blanc, in Rome. In 2018, a second campus has been opened in Milan and in 2019 a third campus has been opened in Belluno, the most important city in the Eastern Dolomites region.

Luiss Business School is accredited by AMBA and EQUIS.

History 
Luiss Business School was founded in 1986 as Luiss School of Management, as the University division dedicated to post-graduate training. In 1991, the first Master of business administration was established, followed in 1995 by the first programme of doctoral degrees in business administration, corporate finance, organisation and human resources.

In 2006, the school assumed its current name and established a partnership program with Fudan University School of Management. The following year, the four doctoral courses were brought together in a single course, completely in English.

In 2013, the Luiss Business School was included in the new Luiss School of Business & Management educational area, together with the Luiss Business & Management Department. In 2015, it obtained the EQUIS accreditation, becoming the third Italian university to obtain this accreditation.

In 2016, the reorganisation of the educational area was completed, with the merging of the Business School and Business & Management Department activities in the new "Luiss Business School". Starting from 9 January 2017, the School moved to its new seat, the recently renovated 19th-century Villa Blanc.

In 2020, Luiss Business School obtained the AMBA accreditation, becoming the fourth Italian university to obtain this accreditation.

Training offer 
The School's training offer comprises an undergraduate course in Economy and Management, four MA courses (three in Italian and one in English) and several other post-graduate, MBA's, masters and doctorate courses, both in Italian and in English.

See also 
 Libera Università Internazionale degli Studi Sociali Guido Carli
 LUISS School of Government

References 

Universities in Italy
Educational institutions established in 1986
1986 establishments in Italy